Mikhail Veniaminovich Kobetsky (14 October 1881, in Odessa – 28 April 1937, in Moscow) was a Soviet politician and diplomat. From 1919 the head of the publishing house of the magazine Kommunisticheskii Internatsional in Petrograd. From 1922 he was a member of ECCI, the director of the Petrograd Department (Bureau) of the Executive Committee of the Communist International (ECCI). In 1921 he entered the Secretariat of ECCI. In 1924–27 he was the Polpred of the Soviet Union to Estonia (1924), Denmark (1924–33), Greece (1934–37) and Albania (1935–37). From January 1933 he was the referent of ECCI for the Scandinavian countries.

He was recalled to Moscow in 1937 and arrested during one of the purges and executed.

References

1881 births
1937 deaths
Communist Party of the Soviet Union members
Executive Committee of the Communist International
Ambassadors of the Soviet Union to Albania
Ambassadors of the Soviet Union to Denmark
Ambassadors of the Soviet Union to Greece
Great Purge victims from Russia
Politicians from Odesa
Russian people executed by the Soviet Union
Ambassadors of the Soviet Union to Estonia